Prefab Four was a play on words, a parody of The Beatles' nickname Fab Four, primarily applied to either of two bands:

 The Monkees
 The Rutles

See also
Fab Four (disambiguation)